Conoclinium dissectum, the  palm-leaf mistflower or palmleaf thoroughwort, is a North American species of flowering plants in the family Asteraceae. It is native to northern  Mexico (Tamaulipas, Chihuahua, Coahuila, Durango, Nuevo León, San Luis Potosí, Sonora, Zacatecas) and the southwestern United States (Arizona, Texas, New Mexico).

Conoclinium dissectum is a perennial often forming tight clumps. One plant generally produces several flower heads, each with lavender or purple disc florets but no ray florets.

References

External links
 
 photo of herbarium specimen collected in San Luis Potosí

Eupatorieae
Flora of the Southwestern United States
Flora of Mexico